The United States men's national soccer team (USMNT) have participated in eleven editions of the FIFA World Cup, an international soccer competition contested by men's national teams representing members of FIFA. The tournament is held every four years by the top qualifying teams from the continental confederations under FIFA. The United States is a member of CONCACAF, which governs the sport in North America, Central America, and the Caribbean, and has the second-most World Cup appearances from the confederation behind Mexico.

The United States participated in the inaugural World Cup in 1930 and finished in the semi-finals, which was later declared a third place finish, their best result to date. The tournament also featured the first hat-trick scored at a World Cup, awarded to American striker Bert Patenaude following recognition by FIFA in 2006. After the 1950 World Cup, in which the United States upset England in group play 1–0, the U.S. was absent from the tournament until 1990. The United States participated in every World Cup from 1990 through 2014, but did not qualify in 2018, marking first time the team had missed a World Cup since 1986. They returned to the World Cup by qualifying for the 2022 edition.

Overall record

*Draws include knockout matches decided via penalty shoot-out

By match

By opponent 

 and  results listed under Czech Republic and Serbia respectively.

Results

Uruguay 1930

Group stage

All times local (UYT)

Semi-finals

Italy 1934

Round of 16

Brazil 1950

Group stage

All times local BRT (UTC-03)

Italy 1990

Group stage

All times local (CEST/UTC+2)

United States 1994

Group stage

Ranking of third-placed teams

Round of 16

France 1998

Group stage

All times local (CEST/UTC+2)

South Korea–Japan 2002

Group stage

All times local (UTC+9)

Round of 16

Quarter-finals

Germany 2006

Group stage

All times local (CEST/UTC+2)

South Africa 2010

Group stage

All times local (UTC+02)

Round of 16

Brazil 2014

Group stage

Round of 16

Qatar 2022

Group stage

Knockout stage

Round of 16

Record players 

Tim Howard world record
On July 1, 2014, Howard was named man of the match, despite the United States losing 2–1 to Belgium after extra time in the round of 16. During the match, he broke the record for most saves in a World Cup match with 15. After breaking this record, his performance was celebrated worldwide on the internet, with the hashtag #ThingsTimHowardCouldSave trending on Twitter.

Top goalscorers 

Own goals scored for opponents
 Jeff Agoos (scored for Portugal in 2002)

Media coverage

The English television rights to the FIFA World Cup have been held by Fox Sports since the 2018 edition and are set to run through 2026. The rights were originally set to expire in 2022, but that tournament's move to a November–December schedule prompted FIFA to award the 2026 rights to appease Fox, who had prior commitments to air other sporting events during the period. The 2022 World Cup broadcast was criticized for ignoring Qatar's human rights issues. Telemundo holds the Spanish television rights to broadcast the FIFA World Cup in the United States; their contract was also renewed through 2026.

Notes

References

External links
 FIFA World Cup official site

 
Countries at the FIFA World Cup
World Cup
World Cup